Lonely Grill is the third studio album by American country music group Lonestar, released in the United States on June 1, 1999 by BNA Records. It reached number 28 on the Billboard 200 chart, and number three on the Top Country Albums chart. With sales of three million copies in the United States, it has been certified 3× Platinum by the RIAA. This was Lonestar's first studio album to have a crossover-friendly country-pop sound, which was a departure from their earlier neotraditional country sound. It is also their first studio album to be recorded as a four-piece, as bassist and second lead vocalist John Rich left the band the previous year in 1998. Instead of replacing him with a new member, the band hired several session bassists to play the album's bass parts.

Content
The singles released from Lonely Grill were, in order of release, "Saturday Night", "Amazed", "Smile", "What About Now", and "Tell Her". While "Saturday Night" peaked at number 47 on the Billboard Hot Country Songs charts, all other singles from this album reached number one on that same chart. "Amazed" was also the group's biggest crossover hit, also peaking at number 1 on the Billboard Hot 100 chart and number 2 on the Hot Adult Contemporary Tracks charts. Also included on this album is an acoustic rendition of the group's late-1998 hit "Everything's Changed" (from their Crazy Nights album). Dann Huff produced all but the last track, which was produced by Sam Ramage and Bob Wright.

This was Lonestar's first album after the departure of bass guitarist John Rich, who recorded a solo album for BNA that same year before pairing up with Big Kenny in the duo Big & Rich. Richie McDonald became the band's sole lead vocalist after Rich's departure, and studio bass guitarists are used in Rich's place.

Critical reception

Giving it three stars out of five, Stephen Thomas Erlewine of AllMusic wrote that Lonestar "take[s] a middle ground, moving back toward hardcore country while retaining elements of the pop sheen of Crazy Nights. The results aren't always successful, but overall, the album is stronger than its immediate predecessor."

Track listing
All tracks produced by Dann Huff except where noted.

Personnel 
As listed in liner notes.

Lonestar
 Richie McDonald – lead vocals, keyboards, acoustic guitar
 Dean Sams – acoustic piano, keyboards, acoustic guitar, harmonica, backing vocals
 Michael Britt – acoustic guitar, electric guitars, backing vocals
 Keech Rainwater – drums, percussion

Additional musicians
 Tim Lauer – accordion
 Steve Nathan – acoustic piano, synthesizers
 Matt Rollings – acoustic piano, Hammond B3 organ
 Gary Burnette – acoustic guitar, mandolin
 Dann Huff – electric guitars
 Biff Watson – acoustic guitar
 Bruce Bouton – pedal steel guitar, lap steel guitar
 Paul Franklin – pedal steel guitar
 Aubrey Haynie – fiddle, mandolin
 Jonathan Yudkin – mandolin
 Mike Brignardello – bass guitar
 Robbie Cheuvront – bass guitar, backing vocals
 Paul Leim – drums
 Eric Darken – percussion
 Chuck Cannon – backing vocals
 Russell Terrell – backing vocals

Technical and Design
 Lonestar – arrangements (12)
 Jeff Balding – tracking, overdub recording, mixing 
 Mark Hagen – tracking assistant, additional engineer, overdub assistant, mix assistant  
 Bob Wright – engineer (12), mixing (12)
 Phil Barnett – assistant engineer (12), mix assistant (12)
 Giles Reaves – digital editing 
 Ken Love – mastering at MasterMix (Nashville, Tennessee)
 Mike "Frog" Griffith – production coordinator 
 Susan Eaddy – art direction 
 Torne White – design 
 Jim "Señior" McGuire – photography 
 Debra Wingo – hair, make-up 
 Ann Waters – stylist

Charts

Weekly charts

Year-end charts

Certifications

References

1999 albums
Lonestar albums
BNA Records albums
Albums produced by Dann Huff